In the late 19th century, many Portuguese, mainly from the islands of Azores and Madeira, migrated to the United States and established communities in cities such as New Bedford, Massachusetts; and San Jose, California. Many of them also moved to Hawaii. There are an estimated 1,500,000 Portuguese Americans based on the Government Census Community Survey.

List of Portuguese American neighborhoods

Alabama
 Mobile

Arizona
 Sedona
 Tucson

California

 Artesia, "International District", known for ethnic diversity
 Bakersfield (Kern County)
 Camarillo
 Castro Valley
 Ceres
 Cherryland
 Chino
 Chowchilla
 Corona
 Culver City - Little Brazil, also has Portuguese
 Dana Point
 Delano
 Denair
 El Granada
 Empire
 Excalon
 Fairfield
 Ferndale
 Fort Bragg
 Fremont
 Fresno
 Gilroy
 Gustine
 Half Moon Bay
 Hanford
 Healdsburg
 Hilmar
 Hollister
 Keyes
 Kings County
 Lathrop
 Lemoore
 Long Beach
 Los Angeles - Little Portugal in San Pedro. Also, Pico Boulevard (Mid-City) - concentrations extend to Central Los Angeles
 Los Banos
 Manteca
 Modesto (and surrounding towns in the Central Valley)
 Monterey
 Newark
 Newman
 Newport Beach
 Norco
 Oakdale
 Oakland - largest Portuguese city in California
 Oakley
 Ontario
 Orange County (esp. around Tustin)
 Orland
 Pasadena
 Petaluma
 Pismo Beach
 Point Loma
 Port Hueneme
 Porterville (and surrounding towns in the Central Valley)
 Portuguese Bend on the Palos Verdes Peninsula
 Redondo Beach
 Rio Vista
 Ripon
 Riverside -  has a Portugal Day event
 Sacramento - could be largest Portuguese community in US
 Salida
 Salinas near Salinas Valley
 San Diego including the Little Italy neighborhood. The surrounding San Diego area has many Portuguese.
 San Francisco - Luso-American cultural center
 San Jose - "Little Portugal" neighborhood
 San Juan Bautista
 San Leandro, city near Oakland with a large Portuguese population.
 San Lorenzo
 San Martin
 San Mateo County
 San Pablo
 San Pedro, known as Little Portugal
 Santa Barbara
 Santa Clara in the Lafayette Street area
 Santa Clara County
 Santa Cruz in the Seabright neighborhood
 Santa Cruz County
 Santa Maria
 Santa Monica
 Shasta Lake
 Sonora
 Stockton
 Sunol
 Torrance
 Tracy
 Tulare
 Turlock
 Vallejo
 Ventura
 Visalia - part of the Portuguese settlement of the San Joaquin Valley
 Watsonville
 West Los Angeles - Little Portugal has Portuguese, more Brazilians and Latin Americans
 Yuba City

Connecticut

 Ansonia
 Bozrah
 Bridgeport
 Chester
 Clinton
 Colchester
 Danbury ("Little Portugal" neighborhood)
 Darien
 Ellington
 Hartford
 Naugatuck
 New Canaan
 Newington
 Rocky Hill
 Stonington
 Wallingford
 Waterbury, home to the Portuguese consulate in Connecticut
 Weston
 Windsor Locks

Delaware

 Bethany Beach
 Dover
 Lewes
 New Castle
 Newark
 Rehoboth Beach
 Seaford
 Smyrna
 Wilmington

District of Columbia
 Washington, D.C.

Florida

 Apalachicola
 Avon Park
 Belle Glade
 Blountstown
 Boca Raton
 Bonifay
 Bradenton
 Brooksville
 Cape Coral
 Casselberry
 Cedar Key
 Chattahoochee
 Chiefland
 Clermont
 Clewiston
 Cocoa
 Crescent City
 Crystal River
 Dade City
 Davie
 DeBary
 Deltona
 Doral
 Everglades City
 Fellsmere
 Fernandina Beach
 Fort Myers
 Fort Walton Beach
 Gulf Breeze
 Haines City
 Hallandale Beach
 High Springs
 Highland Beach
 Holmes Beach
 Homestead
 Jacksonville Beach
 Lady Lake
 Lake City
 Lake Wales
 Lakeland
 Lantana
 Lauderdale Lakes
 Lighthouse Point
 Longboat Key
 Marco Island
 Margate
 Miami - includes Brazilians and Cape Verdeans
 Milton
 Miramar
 Monticello
 Moore Have
 New Smyrna Beach
 Niceville
 North Lauderdale
 Oakland Park
 Okeechobee
 Orlando
 Palatka
 Palm Bay
 Palm Beach
 Palm Beach Gardens
 Palm Coast
 Palmetto Bay
 Panama City Beach
 Parkland
 Pensacola
 Pinecrest
 Plant City
 Plantation
 Pompano Beach
 Port Orange
 Port St. Lucie
 Punta Gorda
 Safety Harbor
 San Antonio
 Sanford
 Sarasota
 Southwest Ranches
 St. Augustine
 St. Petersburg
 Stuart
 Sunny Isles Beach
 Sunrise
 Tallahassee
 Tamarac
 Temple Terrace
 Tequesta
 Titusville
 Venice
 West Park
 Weston
 Wilton Manors
 Winter Garden
 Winter Haven
 Zephyrhills

Georgia

 Acworth
 Americus
 Atlanta
 Augusta
 Bainbridge
 Blairsville
 Canton
 Clarkesville
 Clayton
 Cleveland
 Columbus
 Cumming
 Cuthbert
 Dawsonville
 Decatur
 Donalsonville
 Dublin
 Ellijay
 Fayetteville
 Fitzgerald
 Flowery Branch
 Folkston
 Hartwell
 Jasper
 Johns Creek
 Jonesboro
 Kennesaw
 LaGrange
 Lithonia
 Loganville
 Lookout Mountain
 Macon
 Milledgeville
 Monroe
 Newnan
 Norcross
 Peachtree City
 Peachtree Corners
 Ray City
 Savannah
 Smyrna
 Stone Mountain
 Thomaston
 Thomson
 Tifton
 Toccoa
 Tybee Island
 Valdosta
 Winder

Hawaii

 Ewa Beach
 Haleiwa
 Hawaii (Big Island)
 Hilo
 Honokaa
 Honolulu
 Kahului
 Kailua
 Kalaheo
 Kaneohe
 Kapaa
 Kapaau
 Kauai
 Kekaha
 Koloa
 Lihue
 Makawao
 Maui
 Molokai
 Naalehu
 Paia
 Waialua
 Waianae
 Wailuku
 Waimanalo
 Waimea

Idaho
 Buhl
 Wendell

Illinois
 Chicago - Little Portugal/Brazil
 Galena
 Jacksonville
 Joliet
 Mendota
 Springfield

Indiana
 East Chicago

Louisiana
 New Orleans
 Opelousas

Maine

 Augusta
 Bangor
 Bar Harbor
 Boothbay Harbor
 Brewer
 Bucksport
 Calais
 Cape Elizabeth
 Caribou
 Castine
 Cherryfield
 Danforth
 Dover-Foxcroft
 Fort Fairfield
 Freeport
 Frenchville
 Gorham
 Houlton
 Islesboro
 Jay
 Kittery
 Lewiston
 Lyman
 Machias
 Madawaska
 Mechanic Falls
 Ogunquit
 Presque Isle
 Rumford
 Saco
 Sanford
 Skowhegan
 South Berwick
 Stonington
 Van Buren
 Waterville
 Windham
 Yarmouth

Maryland

 Aberdeen
 Annapolis
 Bowie
 Cambridge
 Centreville
 Cheverly
 Clear Spring
 College Park
 Easton
 Elkton
 Emmitsburg
 Frostburg
 Gaithersburg
 Greenbelt
 Hagerstown
 Hancock
 Hyattsville
 La Plata
 Laurel
 Middletown
 Ocean City
 Poolesville
 Salisbury
 Thurmont
 Upper Marlboro
 Walkersville
 Westminster

Massachusetts

 Amherst
 Athol
 Attleboro
 Blackstone
 Bridgewater
 Brockton
 Cambridge
 Chicopee
 Fall River
 Falmouth
 Fitchburg
 Framingham
 Gloucester
 Hanover
 Haverhill
 Hudson
 Lawrence
 Lowell, Back Central neighborhood
 Ludlow
 Milford
 Nantucket
 New Bedford
 Norwood
 Oak Bluffs
 Paxton
 Peabody
 Pittsfield
 Plainville
 Provincetown, Massachusetts
 Rehoboth
 Somerville
 Southbridge
 Stoughton
 Taunton, 33.7% Portuguese descent
 Wellfleet
 West Stockbridge
 Williamstown
 Winchendon
 Woburn

Michigan
 Jackson
 Traverse City

Minnesota
 St. Cloud

Montana
 Bozeman

Nebraska
 Lincoln

Nevada
 Las Vegas
 Reno - along with Galicians, Spanish and Basques

New Hampshire

 Bedford
 Berlin
 Bristol
 Claremont
 Colebrook
 Concord
 Derry
 Enfield
 Exeter
 Farmington
 Franconia
 Gorham
 Jaffrey
 Keene
 Lancaster
 Lebanon
 Lincoln
 Litchfield
 Littleton
 Meredith
 Merrimack
 New London
 Newmarket
 Newport
 Pittsfield
 Plymouth
 Seabrook
 Somersworth

New Jersey

 East Newark
 Elizabeth
 Englewood Cliffs
 Harrison
 Hillside
 Kearny
 Livingston
 Long Branch
 New Brunswick
 New Providence
 Newark, high percentage of Portuguese people within the Ironbound section
 Little Portugal, aka Little Brazil - home to many Portuguese and Brazilians, as well Spaniards and Latinos   
 North Arlington
 Ocean County
 Old Bridge
 Paterson - Portuguese, Cape Verdean and Brazilian
 Perth Amboy
 Short Hills
 South Amboy
 South River
 Union Township
 Vernon Township

New York

 Buffalo
 Dobbs Ferry
 Ithaca
 Long Island
 Manhattan
 Mineola
 Mount 
Vernon
 Nassau County
 New Rochelle
 New York City (Little Brazil, Manhattan, inhabited by many Portuguese-speaking countries' communities, mainly Portuguese and Brazilian)
 Ossining
 Port Jervis
 Rochester
 Saratoga Springs
 Suffolk County
 Tarrytown
 Yonkers

North Carolina

 Albemarle
 Asheboro
 Brevard
 Burnsville
 Chapel Hill
 Edenton
 Fayetteville
 Forest City
 Goldsboro
 Greenville
 Hamlet
 Hayesville
 Hendersonville
 Hickory
 High Point
 Hillsborough
 Huntersville
 Jacksonville
 Jefferson
 Kannapolis
 Kings Mountain
 Kinston
 Laurinburg
 Lexington
 Louisburg
 Mint Hill
 Mocksville
 Morehead City
 Morganton
 Nags Head
 New Bern
 Newton
 Oriental
 Pinehurst
 Red Springs
 Reidsville
 Roanoke Rapids
 Robbinsville
 Rocky Mount
 Shallotte
 Shelby
 Southern Pines
 Statesville
 Tarboro
 Tryon
 Wake Forest
 Waynesville
 Wendell
 Williamstown
 Wilson
 Winston-Salem
 Wrightsville Beach

Ohio
 Columbus

Oregon
 Astoria

Pennsylvania

 Allentown, including Brazilians and other Latin Americans
 Bethlehem has a Portuguese community of around 5,000. Also has Spaniards and Hispanics.
 Chester
 Grove City
 Philadelphia (Little Portugal, Northeast Philadelphia, a large presence of Portuguese as well as Brazilians)
 Tinicum Township

Rhode Island

 Bristol in Portuguese Town. 25% in town, the state itself is 12% Portuguese. 
 Central Falls 
 Cranston
 Cumberland, particularly the Valley Falls section.
 East Providence
 Little Compton
 New Shoreham
 Newport
 Pawtucket, largest Portuguese city in New England
 Smithfield
 Tiverton
 Warren
 West Warwick

South Carolina

 Abbeville
 Aiken
 Batesburg-Leesville
 Beaufort
 Bluffton
 Blythewood
 Camden
 Clover
 Easley
 Edgefield
 Florence
 Fort Mill
 Greenwood
 Hanahan
 Hardeeville
 Hartsville
 Hilton Head Island
 Kingstree
 Lancaster
 Laurens
 Loris
 Marion
 Moncks Corner
 Newberry
 North Augusta
 North Myrtle Beach
 Pawleys Island
 Pickens
 Rock Hill
 Santee
 Sullivan's Island
 Summerton
 Summerville
 Sumter
 York

Texas
 Galveston
 Houston

Vermont

 Bennington
 Bradford
 Brattleboro
 Bridport
 Burlington
 Colchester
 Danville
 Fairfax
 Fairfield
 Hardwick
 Irasburg
 Milton
 Newport
 Northfield
 Norwich
 Pittsford
 Randolph
 Richford
 Rutland (city)
 Rutland (town)
 Springfield
 Stamford
 Stowe
 Swanton
 Wallingford
 Williston
 Wilmington
 Winooski
 Woodstock

Virginia

 Abingdon
 Appomattox
 Ashland
 Bristol
 Charlottesville
 Clifton Forge
 Covington
 Emporia
 Fairfax
 Falls Church
 Harrisonburg
 Herndon
 Jonesville
 Leesburg
 Lexington
 Manassas
 Newport News
 Purcellville
 Richmond
 Roanoke
 Rocky Mount
 Staunton
 Vienna
 Warrenton
 Waynesboro
 Williamsburg

Washington
 Seattle
 Walla Walla

West Virginia

 Berkeley Springs
 Bluefield
 Buckhannon
 Chester
 Clarksburg
 Dunbar
 Elkins
 Fairmont
 Gassaway
 Grafton
 Grantsville
 Hinton
 Huntington
 Hurricane
 Kingwood
 Marlinton
 Martinsburg
 Morgantown
 Moundsville
 New Martinsville
 Parkersburg
 Rainelle
 Ravenswood
 Romney
 Ronceverte
 Shepherdstown
 Shinnston
 Sistersville
 Summersville
 Vienna
 Webster Springs
 Weirton
 Weston
 Wheeling
 Williamson

Wisconsin
 Door County
 Kenosha

References

Portuguese neighborhoods in the United States
Portuguese-American history